Straight to Hell may refer to:

Music
 "Straight to Hell" (The Clash song), 1982
 "Straight to Hell" (Drivin N Cryin song), 1989, also recorded by Darius Rucker
 Straight to Hell (soundtrack), the soundtrack of the 1987 film
 "Straight to Hell", a song on the 2001 album Welcome to the Other Side by German heavy metal band Rage
 "Straight to Hell", 2019 song by Ozzy Osbourne from Ordinary Man
 Straight to Hell (album), a 2006 album by Hank Williams III
 Headfirst Straight to Hell, the fifth and final full-length album by Grade in 2001

Film and television
 Straight to Hell (film), a 1987 independent action-comedy film directed by Alex Cox
 Straight to Hell (Kathy Griffin special), a 2007 comedy special by stand-up comic Kathy Griffin

Publishing
 S.T.H., an acronym for Straight to Hell, a gay pornographic magazine